Mfuwe Airport  is an airport serving Mfuwe, a diffuse settlement in Mambwe District in the Eastern Province in Zambia. It serves the tourism industry based on the nearby South Luangwa National Park and other wildlife areas in the Luangwa Valley. It is one of four international airports in Zambia, with seasonal international flights.

Facilities 
It has one runway.

Airlines and destinations

See also
Transport in Zambia
List of airports in Zambia

References

External links
SkyVector - Mfuwe Airport

Travelling via Mfuwe to South Luangwa

Airports in Zambia
Buildings and structures in Eastern Province, Zambia